The women's 1000 metres race of the 2013–14 ISU Speed Skating World Cup 5, arranged in Eisstadion Inzell, in Inzell, Germany, was held on 9 March 2014.

Heather Richardson of the United States won, while Brittany Bowe of the United States came second, and Olga Fatkulina came third. Miyako Sumiyoshi of Japan won the Division B race.

Results
The race took place on Sunday, 9 March, with Division B scheduled in the morning session, at 10:57, and Division A scheduled in the afternoon session, at 13:57.

Division A

Division B

References

Women 1000
5